The Magnificent Adventurer is a 1963 adventure film directed by Riccardo Freda. It is loosely based on real life events of Benvenuto Cellini.

Plot

Cast

Production
The Magnificent Adventurer was director Riccardo Freda's last film for Panda Cinematografica. It was based on the real-life character of Benvenuto Cellini, a sculptor, goldsmith, draftsman, soldier and musician. A memoir of his life gained huge popularity during the 19th century which became the inspiration for other famous writers such as Alexandre Dumas. Freda was fascinated by Cellini, declaring him Cellini has "always been a model of independence for me. However, he was more of a great brigand than a great artist." The script does follow Cellini's memoirs, and places him in an imaginary scenario.

The Magnificent Adventurer was shot under the title Le avventure di Benvenuto Cellini between March and April 1963 in Rome at Castle Sant'Angelo, Castle d'Ostia, and at the De Paolis Studios.

Release
The Magnificent Adventurer was released in Italy on August 3, 1963 where it was distributed by Regional. It grossed 121 million lire in Italy which film historian and critic Roberto Curti described as "nondescript". The film was released as Laventurier magnifigue (L'Aigle de Florence) and was purchased by American International Pictures for distribution to television as The Magnificent Adventurer. It was also released under the title The Burning of Rome.

Reception 
A contemporary review in the Monthly Film Bulletin described the film as "more serious and sober than much of Freda's other recent work, and his admirers may be a little disappointed at the often lethargic and lackluster result, which is quite inferior to the very similar Seventh Sword for instance."

Richard Roud referred to the film as "a constant pleasure to the eye" and "a glittering riot of delicate colour shadings in both sets and costumes".

References

Footnotes

Sources

External links

1963 films
1960s historical adventure films
French historical adventure films
Italian historical adventure films
Spanish historical adventure films
Films directed by Riccardo Freda
Films scored by Francesco De Masi
Films set in Rome
Films set in the 16th century
Biographical films about artists
Cultural depictions of Michelangelo
Cultural depictions of Francis I of France
Cultural depictions of Charles V, Holy Roman Emperor
Cultural depictions of Pope Clement VII
Cultural depictions of Benvenuto Cellini
Biographical films about sculptors
1960s French films
1960s Italian films